Agency is a village in Buchanan County, Missouri, United States. The population was 684 at the 2010 census. It is part of the St. Joseph, MO–KS Metropolitan Statistical Area.

History
Agency was laid out in 1865. It was formerly the site of an agency of the Sac and Fox Indians, hence the name. A post office called Agency has been in operation since 1872. On Sunday, May 20, 1923 a Ku Klux Klan picnic held at Agency was attended by several thousand people. Speakers included Rev. Bloom, Rev. Smallwood, and Rev. Rendlemarr, all of Partee Park Baptist Church.

Geography
Agency is located at  (39.648739, -94.744418).

Demographics

2010 census
As of the census of 2010, there were 684 people, 257 households, and 210 families living in the village. The racial makeup of the village was 96.6% White, 0.3% African American, 0.9% Asian, 1.2% from other races, and 1.0% from two or more races. Hispanic or Latino of any race were 2.9% of the population.

There were 257 households, of which 38.1% had children under the age of 18 living with them, 68.5% were married couples living together, 8.2% had a female householder with no husband present, 5.1% had a male householder with no wife present, and 18.3% were non-families. 12.5% of all households were made up of individuals, and 5.1% had someone living alone who was 65 years of age or older. The average household size was 2.66 and the average family size was 2.92.

The median age in the village was 37.5 years. 24.9% of residents were under the age of 18; 8.6% were between the ages of 18 and 24; 26.4% were from 25 to 44; 29.5% were from 45 to 64; and 10.5% were 65 years of age or older. The gender makeup of the village was 50.3% male and 49.7% female.

2000 census
As of the census of 2000, there were 599 people, 214 households, and 176 families living in the village. The population density was 309.3 people per square mile (119.2/km). There were 222 housing units at an average density of 114.6 per square mile (44.2/km). The racial makeup of the village was 98.50% White, 0.50% Asian, 0.50% from other races, and 0.50% from two or more races. Hispanic or Latino of any race were 1.67% of the population.

There were 214 households, out of which 44.4% had children under the age of 18 living with them, 69.6% were married couples living together, 9.3% had a female householder with no husband present, and 17.3% were non-families. 12.6% of all households were made up of individuals, and 2.8% had someone living alone who was 65 years of age or older. The average household size was 2.80 and the average family size was 3.04.

In the village, the population was spread out, with 30.1% under the age of 18, 6.5% from 18 to 24, 33.7% from 25 to 44, 24.5% from 45 to 64, and 5.2% who were 65 years of age or older. The median age was 35 years. For every 100 females, there were 104.4 males. For every 100 females age 18 and over, there were 96.7 males.

The median income for a household in the village was $49,375, and the median income for a family was $52,500. Males had a median income of $37,969 versus $24,018 for females. The per capita income for the village was $20,304. About 3.7% of families and 6.1% of the population were below the poverty line, including 7.1% of those under age 18 and 9.1% of those age 65 or over.

References

External links

Villages in Buchanan County, Missouri
St. Joseph, Missouri metropolitan area
Villages in Missouri